Lotus Hill is a hill in Panyu, Guangzhou, Guangdong, China, with Shizi Lake to the west. It is now a 4A-level national park.

The hill's name comes from the legend of a vicious dragon in the South Sea who raised winds and waves in the Pearl River estuary flooding lands and capsizing boats, causing the local people to suffer. Mother Buddha came by and was furious at the dragon's behavior. She threw her lotus on which she sat into the water, thus the evil dragon was brought under control and the lotus turned into a mountain many years later. Hence its name — Lotus Hill.

Lotus Hill is noted for its Western Han dynasty quarry which formed steep cliffs, alcoves, and other fantastic scenes.

There are two major activities in this area. One is the Lotus Festival which is celebrated annually from June to August. It is a grand gathering of lotus when more than 100 species are exhibited. The other is Peach Blossom Festival which is observed during the spring when the whole mountain is swathed in a blossom of pink flowers.

References

Hills of China
Landforms of Guangdong
Tourist attractions in Guangzhou